Perillus is a genus of predatory stink bugs in the family Pentatomidae. There are about seven described species in Perillus.

Species
These seven species belong to the genus Perillus:
 Perillus bioculatus (Fabricius, 1775) i c g b (two-spotted stink bug)
 Perillus circumcinctus Stal, 1862 i c g b
 Perillus confluens (Herrich-schaeffer, 1839) i c g b
 Perillus exaptus (Say, 1825) i c g b
 Perillus lunatus Knight, 1952 i c g
 Perillus splendidus (Uhler, 1861) i c g b
 Perillus strigipes (Herrich-Schaeffer, 1853) i c g b
Data sources: i = ITIS, c = Catalogue of Life, g = GBIF, b = Bugguide.net

References

Further reading

External links

 

Asopinae
Pentatomidae genera